Francisco Marín Castán is the President of the Civil Chamber of the Supreme Court. He assumed the office in February 2021 after Juan Antonio Xiol Ríos. He is also the Vice President of the Supreme Court since June 2020. Francisco Castán, a professor of procedural law and magistrate. He is a member of the Francisco de Vitoria Association of Judges and Magistrates which he previously served as acting president of the aforementioned Supreme Court.

Francisco Castán was born in 1952, he started the judiciary career in 1977. He was the magistrate of the Civil Chamber of the High Court in 2000, and the Corresponding academic of the Royal Academy of Jurisprudence and Legislation in 2008.

Francisco has been professor of Procedural Law and Civil Law in the National Distance Education University Huelva working for nine years in the institute.

Francisco was appointed by the Plenary of the General Council of the Judiciary on February 20, 2021 presided over by Carlos Lesmes, President of the Supreme Court and of the CGPJ.

References 

20th-century Spanish judges
1952 births
Living people
Members of the General Council of the Judiciary
21st-century Spanish judges